Setton may refer to:

 Amanda Setton (born 1985), American actress
 Ishai Setton (born circa. 1975), American film and television director, editor and producer
 Kenneth Setton (1914–1995), American historian
 Lori Ann Setton (born 1962), American biomechanical engineer
 Maxwell Setton (born 1909), British film producer